This is a list of bebop musicians.

A
Al Aarons - trumpet
Greg Abate - saxophone
Nat Adderley - cornet
Julian "Cannonball" Adderley - saxophone
Toshiko Akiyoshi - piano
Joe Albany - piano
Monty Alexander
Jimmy Amadie
Georgie Auld
Gene Ammons - saxophone

B
Elek Bacsik - violin
Benny Bailey - trumpet
Sheryl Bailey - guitar
Gabe Baltazar - alto saxophone
Guy Barker - trumpet
Louie Bellson - drums
Eddie Bert
Denzil Best - drums
Walter Bishop, Jr. - piano
Art Blakey - drums
DuPree Bolton - trumpet
Nelson Boyd - bass
Randy Brecker - trumpet
Clifford Brown - trumpet
Ray Brown - bass
Dave Brubeck - piano
Clora Bryant - trumpet
Ray Bryant
Monty Budwig
Ralph Burns
Kenny Burrell - guitar
Don Byas - saxophone
Charlie Byrd

C
Red Callender - bass
Conte Candoli - trumpet
Pete Candoli - trumpet
Candido Camero - percussion
Serge Chaloff - saxophone
Frank Capp
Charlie Christian - guitar
Sonny Clark - piano
Kenny Clarke - drums
Jimmy Cleveland - trombone
Tony Coe - clarinet, saxophone
Al Cohn - saxophone
Dolo Coker - piano
Richie Cole - saxophone
George Coleman - saxophone
John Coltrane - saxophone
Sonny Criss - saxophone

D
Tadd Dameron - piano
Eddie "Lockjaw" Davis - saxophone
Miles Davis - trumpet
Blossom Dearie - piano, vocals
Rusty Dedrick - trumpet
Buddy DeFranco - clarinet
Paul Desmond - alto saxophone
Paquito D'Rivera - saxophone, clarinet
Jimmy Deuchar - trumpet
Lou Donaldson - saxophone
Kenny Dorham - trumpet
Bob Dorough - piano, vocals
George Duvivier - bass

E
Billy Eckstine - vocals, trumpet, trombonist, composer, bandleader
Teddy Edwards - saxophone
Herb Ellis - guitar
Rolf Ericson - trumpet
Bill Evans - piano, composer

F
John Faddis - trumpet
Tal Farlow - guitar
Art Farmer - trumpet, flugelhorn
Leonard Feather - piano
Ella Fitzgerald - singer
Claudio Fasoli - saxophonist
Tommy Flanagan - piano
Gary Foster

G
Barry Galbraith - guitar
Erroll Garner - piano
Hal Galper - piano
Linton Garner - piano
Herb Geller - saxophone
Stan Getz - saxophone
Terry Gibbs - vibraphone
Dizzy Gillespie - trumpet
Benny Golson - saxophone
Babs Gonzales - vocals
Dexter Gordon - saxophone
Wardell Gray - saxophone
Bennie Green - trombone
Grant Green - guitar
Thurman Green
Urbie Green - trombone
Al Grey - trombone
Johnny Griffin - saxophone
Tiny Grimes - guitar
Lars Gullin - saxophone

H
Shafi Hadi - alto saxophone
Al Haig - piano
Sadik Hakim - piano
Jeff Hamilton
Jimmy Hamilton - clarinet, saxophone
Slide Hampton - trombone
George Handy
Al Harewood
Barry Harris - piano
Benny Harris - trumpet
Clyde Hart - piano
Stan Hasselgard - clarinet
Hampton Hawes - piano
Coleman Hawkins - saxophone
Tubby Hayes - saxophone, vibraphone, flute
Roy Haynes - drums
J.C. Heard - drums
Albert Heath - drums
Jimmy Heath - saxophone
Percy Heath - double-bass
Ernie Henry - saxophone
Earl Hines - piano
Jutta Hipp - piano
Red Holloway - saxophone
Elmo Hope - piano
Freddie Hubbard - trumpet

J
Chubby Jackson - double-bass
Milt Jackson - vibraphone
Illinois Jacquet - tenor saxophone
Ahmad Jamal - piano
Keith Jarrett - piano
Clifford Jarvis - drums
Aaron M. Johnson - saxophone, clarinet
Budd Johnson - saxophone, clarinet
Clarence Johnson
J. J. Johnson - trombone
Osie Johnson - drums
Pete Jolly
Hank Jones - piano
Oliver Jones (pianist)
Philly Joe Jones - drums
Quincy Jones - arranger, trumpet
Thad Jones - trumpet
Duke Jordan - piano
Clifford Jordan - alto, tenor saxophones

K
Yoko Kanno - piano, accordion
Roger Kellaway
Wynton Kelly - piano
Barney Kessel - guitar

L
Don Lamond - drums
Jay Leonhart
Stan Levey - drums
Lou Levy - piano
John Lewis - piano
Mel Lewis - drums
Victor Lewis
Melba Liston - trombone

M
Adam Makowicz - piano
Russell Malone - guitar
Junior Mance - piano
Shelly Manne - drums
Larance Marable - drums
Charlie Mariano - alto saxophone
Dodo Marmarosa - piano
Les McCann - piano
Rob McConnell - valve trombone
Howard McGhee - trumpet
Al McKibbon - double-bass
Marian McPartland - piano
Charles McPherson - alto saxophone
Gil Melle - saxophones
Pierre Michelot - bass
Charles Mingus - double-bass
Thelonious Monk - piano
Tete Montoliu - piano
James Moody - tenor saxophone, flute
Michael Moore - bass
Michael Moore - saxophone, clarinet
Lee Morgan - trumpet
George Morrow - double-bass
Gerry Mulligan - baritone saxophone, piano, arranger

N
Fats Navarro - trumpet
Herbie Nichols - piano
Sam Noto - trumpet

O
Anita O'Day - vocals
Hod O'Brien - piano

P
Marty Paich - arranger
Remo Palmier - guitar
Charlie Parker - saxophone
Leo Parker - saxophone
Joe Pass - guitar
Cecil Payne - flute, saxophone
Sonny Payne - drums
Niels-Henning Ørsted Pedersen - double-bass
Art Pepper - saxophone
Oscar Peterson - piano
Oscar Pettiford - cellist, double-bass
Flip Phillips - saxophone, clarinet
Herb Pomeroy - trumpet
Roy Porter - drums
Tommy Potter - bass
Bud Powell - piano
Richie Powell - piano
Specs Powell - drums
Chano Pozo - percussion
André Previn - piano
Don Pullen - piano, organ

R
Gene Ramey - bass
Jimmy Raney - guitar
Buddy Rich - drums
Sam Rivers - saxophone, clarinet
Max Roach - drums
Steve Rochinski - guitar
Red Rodney - trumpet
Sonny Rollins - saxophone
Jimmy Rowles - piano
Ernie Royal - trumpet
Hilton Ruiz - piano
Curly Russell - bass

S
Aaron Sachs - saxophone, clarinet
Ronnie Scott - saxophone
Jack Sels - saxophone
Lalo Schifrin - piano
Ed Shaughnessy - drummer
George Shearing - piano
Jack Sheldon - trumpet, vocals
Sahib Shihab - saxophone, flute
Ayako Shirasaki - piano
Horace Silver - piano
Andy Simpkins
Zoot Sims - saxophone
Ronnie Singer - guitar
Paul Smith - piano
Mary Stallings - singer
Herbie Steward - saxophones
Sonny Stitt - saxophone
Idrees Sulieman - trumpet
Ira Sullivan - trumpet, flugelhorn

T
Art Taylor - drums
Billy Taylor - piano
Tommy Tedesco - guitar
Clark Terry - trumpet, flugelhorn
Toots Thielemans - harmonica
Jesper Thilo - saxophone, clarinet, flute
Ed Thigpen - drums
René Thomas - guitar
"Sir" Charles Thompson - piano
Lucky Thompson - saxophone
Lennie Tristano - piano
Bruce Turner - saxophone, clarinet

U
René Urtreger - piano

V
Charlie Ventura - saxophone
Sarah Vaughan - vocals
Mads Vinding - bass
Eddie Vinson - saxophone

W
George Wallington - piano
Butch Warren - double-bass
Bill Watrous - trombone
Frank Wess - saxophone, flute
Ernie Wilkins - saxophone
Mary Lou Williams - piano
Shadow Wilson - drums
Kai Winding - trombone
Phil Woods - saxophone, clarinet

Z
Ed Zandy - trumpet

See also

List of jazz musicians

References

External links

 Bebop
 
 
Musicians
Bebop